Hartmut Wedekind (born 16 June 1964) is a German swimmer. He competed in the men's 200 metre breaststroke at the 1988 Summer Olympics representing West Germany.

References

1964 births
Living people
German male swimmers
Olympic swimmers of West Germany
Swimmers at the 1988 Summer Olympics
Sportspeople from Duisburg